{{Infobox television season
| episode_list         = List of Gintama episodes
| image                = File:Gintamaseason3.jpg
| caption              = Cover from the first DVD of ''Gintamas third season
| country              = Japan
| network              = TV Tokyo
| prev_season          = Season 2
| next_season          = Season 4
| first_aired          = 
| last_aired           = 
| num_episodes         = 51
| season_number        = 3
| image_alt            = 
| starring             = 
| released             = 
}}
The episodes of the third season of the Japanese anime television series Gintama aired on Japan's TV Tokyo from April 3, 2008 to March 26, 2009. The third season has a total of 51 episodes expanding the series' episodes to 150. They are animated by Sunrise. Episodes 100 to 105 were directed by Shinji Takamatsu and Yoichi Fujita, while in following episodes Fujita was the only director. The anime is based on Hideaki Sorachi's manga of the same name. The story revolves around an eccentric samurai, Gintoki Sakata, his apprentice, Shinpachi Shimura, and a teenage alien girl named Kagura. All three are "free-lancers" who search for work in order to pay the monthly rent, which usually goes unpaid anyway.

In Japan, Aniplex distributes the anime in DVD format. The first volume of the third season was released on August 27, 2008.

On January 8, 2009, the streaming video site Crunchyroll began offering English subtitled episodes of the series. The episodes are available on Crunchyroll within hours of airing in Japan to paying members. The episodes can also be watched for free a week after release. The first available episode was episode 139. On the same day, Crunchyroll also began uploading episodes from the beginning of the series at a rate of two a week.

Like previous seasons, the third season uses six pieces of musical themes: two opening themes and four ending themes. The first twenty-six episodes use  by Does as the opening theme.  by Monobright replaces "Donten" for the following episodes. The first ending theme is "Sanagi" ( "Chrysalis") by POSSIBILITY. Since episode 113, the ending theme is "This world is yours" by Plingmin. The four ending used since episode 139 is SHIGI's . Episodes 105 and 150 exchange the use of the themes; this leaves episode 105 with "Sanagi" as the opening and with "Donten" as the ending while "Kagayaita" and "Anata Magic" are the opening and ending themes, respectively, in episode 150.



Episode list

 References GeneralSpecific'''

2008 Japanese television seasons
2009 Japanese television seasons
Season 3